Manjina There (Kannada: ಮಂಜಿನ ತೆರೆ) is a 1980 Indian Kannada film, directed by Bangalore Nagesh and produced by K. R. Narayana Murthy. The film stars Srinath, Manjula, Thoogudeepa Srinivas and Dinesh in the lead roles. The film has musical score by Upendra Kumar.

Cast

 Srinath
 Manjula
 Thoogudeepa Srinivas
 Dinesh
 Shakti Prasad
 Chethan Ramrao
 Narasimharaju
 Sampath
 Vajramuni
 Shashikala
 Mamatha Shenoy
 Saroja
 Rajakumari
 Vathsala
 Raghunath
 Thipatur Siddaramaiah

Soundtrack
The music was composed by Upendra Kumar.

References

External links
 

1980s Kannada-language films
Films scored by Upendra Kumar